Riley Patrick McGree (born 2 November 1998) is an Australian professional footballer who plays as an attacking midfielder for EFL Championship club Middlesbrough and the Australian national team.

Born in Gawler, South Australia, McGree played youth football for Gawler, the FFSA NTC and Adelaide United before starting his professional career with Adelaide United in 2016. He joined Club Brugge of the Belgian top flight in 2017, and spent two loan spells back in Australia with Newcastle Jets and Melbourne City before returning to Adelaide United. That club sold him to Major League Soccer expansion franchise Charlotte FC, who loaned him to English Championship club Birmingham City for 18 months before selling him to Middlesbrough in 2022.

McGree was first called up to the Australian national team in 2017, having previously played for Australia under-17 in 2013.

Early life
McGree was born and raised in Gawler, South Australia, to the north of Adelaide. He joined Gawler Eagles FC as a four-year-old after the town's Australian rules football club was full, and remained with the Eagles for eight years.

Club career

Adelaide United
McGree made his debut for Adelaide United in the A-League on 19 March 2016 in a draw with Western Sydney Wanderers. He made his first start for the club in a 2016 FFA Cup loss to Redlands United on 3 August 2016, having been called up from the club's youth squad. Two weeks later, McGree signed a one-year senior contract with Adelaide. McGree scored his first goal for the Reds in his second A-League start, on 29 January 2017, with a shot from the edge of the area in a draw with Wellington Phoenix.

Club Brugge
After impressing at Adelaide United, including being called up for the Australian national team, McGree left the national Australian league in July 2017 to join Belgian club Club Brugge.

Loan to Newcastle Jets
On 19 December 2017, it was announced that McGree would be joining the Newcastle Jets on a short-term loan deal for the remainder of the 2017–18 A-League season, as an injury replacement for Jake Adelson. The transfer would be officially lodged in January, with him expected to join the squad in late January, due to his international commitments in 2018 AFC U-23 Championship.

In that season's A-League semi-finals, McGree became the subject of international attention after scoring with a scorpion kick, and which received a nomination for the FIFA Puskas Award for the most beautiful goal in the world that year.

At the end of the season McGree returned to Club Brugge, though Newcastle Jets looked to sign him on loan once more.

Loan to Melbourne City
In June 2018, a few weeks after the announcement that McGree returned to Club Brugge, he returned to the A-League, joining Melbourne City on a season-long loan.

Return to Adelaide United
On 5 July 2019, it was announced that McGree would return to Adelaide United for an undisclosed fee for the next three seasons. McGree starred for Adelaide United in his season back for Adelaide United scoring 10 goals in the league and 3 goals in the cup, including one in the FFA Cup final against Melbourne City. He capped off his season by winning the Aurelio Vidmar Club Champion award for the best and fairest player at Adelaide United, and winning the club's golden boot award.

Charlotte FC
On 5 October 2020, McGree was sold to Major League Soccer expansion franchise Charlotte FC for an undisclosed fee.

Loan to Birmingham City
Immediately after joining Charlotte FC, McGree was loaned to English Championship club Birmingham City for the season. He made his Birmingham City debut on 17 October, as a substitute in a 1–0 defeat at home to Sheffield Wednesday. Two weeks later, he scored his first goal two minutes into his first start, away to Preston North End, when he reacted quickest to a loose ball after Lukas Jutkiewicz's mis-hit shot; the match ended 2–1 to Birmingham. McGree finished the season with 15 appearances, and his loan was renewed until 1 January 2022. He made his first league start of 2021–22 in October, in place of the injured Tahith Chong, and according to the Birmingham Mail, became "undroppable, impressing with his work-rate, mobility, versatility and, latterly, quality." He scored twice and made two assists in 13 league matches before his loan expired.

Although McGree was expected to return to Charlotte FC in preparation for their MLS debut, rumours in early January linked him with a permanent move either to Scottish Premiership club Celtic, managed by Ange Postecoglou, the coach who first called him up to the senior national team, or to another EFL Championship club. He chose not to join Celtic, and on 14 January, he signed for Middlesbrough.

Middlesbrough
McGree signed a three-and-a-half-year contract with EFL Championship club Middlesbrough on 14 January 2022; the fee was undisclosed. McGree made his debut for the club on 12 February, coming off the bench during a 4–1 win against Derby County.

International career
McGree was called up to the Australia under-17 team in August 2013 for the 2013 AFF U-16 Youth Championship in Myanmar. He scored a hat-trick in the side's group stage win over Brunei.

In March 2017, McGree was called up to the Australian team for the first time, for 2018 FIFA World Cup qualification matches against Iraq and UAE.

In November 2019 he was one of four players suspended by the Australia national under-23 soccer team due to "unprofessional conduct". The four players allegedly mistreated a woman after an intimate encounter. As a result, McGree was forbidden to play in the upcoming 2020 AFC U-23 Championship, but was free to be selected for their World Cup team if Australia qualify.

McGree made his senior debut on 3 June 2021, as a late substitute in a 3–0 win against Kuwait in a 2022 World Cup qualifier. In a man-of-the-match performance on his first start, he provided two assists in a 5–1 victory against Chinese Taipei, and was a late substitute as Australia beat Jordan to complete a perfect record in the second phase of qualifying. He scored his first international goal to complete Australia's 4–0 defeat of Vietnam on 27 January 2022 in a third-phase qualifier.

In November 2022, McGree was called up to play in the 2022 FIFA World Cup he started in the Socceroos opening match against France National Football Team McGree started but the Aussies were beaten 4-1. In there second group stage game McGree started against Tunisia national football team which Australia went onto win 1-0 in there final group stage game the Middlesbrough FC Star assisted Matthew Leckie’s goal which was just enough to beat Denmark 1-0.
In the round of 16 Australia played Argentina National Football Team McGree started for the fourth time in a row but Australia went onto lose 2-1.

Career statistics

Club

International

Honours
Adelaide United
 A-League Premiership: 2015–16
 FFA Cup: 2019

References

External links
 

1998 births
Living people
People from Gawler, South Australia
Australian soccer players
Australia international soccer players
Australia youth international soccer players
Association football midfielders
Adelaide United FC players
Club Brugge KV players
Newcastle Jets FC players
Melbourne City FC players
Charlotte FC players
Birmingham City F.C. players
Middlesbrough F.C. players
A-League Men players
National Premier Leagues players
English Football League players
Footballers at the 2020 Summer Olympics
Olympic soccer players of Australia
Australian expatriate soccer players
Australian expatriates in Belgium
Expatriate footballers in Belgium
Australian expatriates in the United States
Expatriate soccer players in the United States
Australian expatriates in England
Expatriate footballers in England
2022 FIFA World Cup players